The coat of arms of the City of London is the official coat of arms of the City of London, which is one of a number of cities and boroughs in Greater London.

Description and blazon
The Corporation of the City of London has a full achievement of armorial bearings consisting of a shield on which the arms are displayed, a crest displayed on a helmet above the shield, supporters on either side and a motto displayed on a scroll beneath the arms.

The blazon of the arms is as follows:
Arms: Argent a cross gules, in the first quarter a sword in pale point upwards of the last.
Crest: On a wreath argent and gules a dragon's sinister wing argent charged on the underside with a cross throughout gules.
Supporters: On either side a dragon argent charged on the undersides of the wings with a cross throughout gules.

It appears to have been adopted in the 17th century, as the earliest record of it is in 1633.

A banner of the arms (the design on the shield) is flown as a flag of the City.

Historical development

The coat of arms is "anciently recorded" at the College of Arms. It was in use in 1381, forming part of the design of a new mayoral seal brought into use on 17 April of that year. The arms consist of a silver shield bearing a red cross with a red upright sword in the first quarter. They combine the emblems of the patron saints of England and London: the Cross of St George with the symbol of the martyrdom of Saint Paul. The 1381 arms replaced an earlier shield, found on an early 13th-century seal, and on two embroidered seal-bags of 1319, that depicted St Paul holding a sword. It is sometimes said that the sword in the 1381 arms represents the dagger used by Lord Mayor of London William Walworth to kill Wat Tyler, leader of the Peasants' Revolt, on 15 June 1381. This tradition dates at least as far back as the first edition of Holinshed's Chronicles, published in 1577, but cannot be correct, as the arms were in use some months before Tyler's death.

The crest and supporters came into use in the 17th century, but were used without authority until 30 April 1957, when they were confirmed and granted by letters patent from the College of Arms.

The crest is a dragon's wing bearing the cross of St George, borne upon a peer's helmet. A primitive form of the crest first appeared in 1539 on the reverse of a new common seal. This showed a fan-like object bearing a cross. Over time this evolved into a dragon's wing, and was shown as such in 1633 when it appeared above the city's coat of arms in the frontispiece to the fourth edition of John Stow's Survey of London. The wing is specified as a dragon's "sinister" wing, i.e. its proper left wing. It has been speculated that the use of a peer's helmet (rather than that of a gentleman, as appears in other civic arms) relates to the use of the honorific prefix "The Right Honourable" by the Lord Mayor. The helm was confirmed in 1957. Earlier representations sometimes show the arms surmounted by a "Muscovy hat", as worn by the City Swordbearer during the Stuart and Georgian periods: a notable example is seen carved above the main southern entrance to Guildhall.

On the seal of 1381 two lions were shown supporting the arms. However, by 1609 the present supporters, two silver dragons bearing red crosses upon their wings, had been adopted. The dragons were probably suggested by the legend of Saint George and the Dragon.

Gallery

See also
 Flag of the City of London
 Coat of arms of London County Council

Sources

External links
 

City of London
London
London
London